Section 2 is one of the eleven sections of the NYSPHSAA. It is made up of high schools from around New York's Capital Region. The schools in the section compete with each other in athletic competition. Schools often compete with other schools outside of the section in tournaments or invitationals such as a cross country invitational in the fall or even sometimes during the regular season, depending on the sport. The section is further divided into leagues based on mostly location but also the size of the school. The schools in the section compete with each other over the course of three seasons, fall, winter, and spring. Depending on the season, different sports take place.

Leagues 
The section is made up of 9 leagues mostly based on location but also based on size to ensure fair competition. Schools mostly compete with the other schools in their league but will sometimes compete with schools outside of it. This usually happens during the championship season when teams are competing for the section or state title. The following is the list of leagues with their member schools.

Adirondack League 
 Argyle High School
 Bolton High School
 Corinth High School
 Fort Ann High School
 Fort Edward High School
 Hadley-Luzerne High School
 Hartford High School
 Granville High School
 Lake George High School
 North Warren High School
 Salem High School
 Warrensburg High School
 Whitehall High School

CHVL 
 Bishop Maginn High School
 Doane Stuart School
 Emma Willard School
 Germantown High School
 Heatly High School
 Hawthorne Valley
 Loudonville Christian School
 New Lebanon High School

Colonial Council 
 Academy of the Holy Names
 The Albany Academies
 Catholic Central High School
 Cobleskill-Richmondville High School
 Cohoes High School
 Ichabod Crane High School
 Lansingburgh High School
 La Salle Institute
 Mohonasen High School
 Ravena-Coeymans-Selkirk High School
 Schalmont High School
 Voorheesville High School
 Watervliet High School

Foothills Council 
 Amsterdam High School
 Broadalbin/Perth High School
 Glens Falls High School
 Gloversville High School
 Hudson Falls High School
 Johnstown High School
 Queensbury High School
 Schuylerville High School
 Scotia-Glenville High School
 South Glens Falls High School

Patroon Conference 
 Albany Leadership Charter High School for Girls
 Catskill High School
 Cairo-Durham High School
 Chatham High School
 Coxsackie-Athens High School
 Green Tech High School
 Greenville High School
 Hudson High School
 Maple Hill High School
 Rennselaer High School
 Taconic Hills High School

Suburban Council 
 Albany High School
 Averill Park High School
 Ballston Spa High School
 Bethlehem High School
 Burnt Hills-Ballston Lake High School
 Christian Brothers Academy
 Colonie High School
 Columbia High School
 Guilderland High School
 Niskayuna High School
 Saratoga Springs High School
 Schenectady High School
 Shaker High School
 Shenendehowa High School
 Troy High School

Wasaren 
 Berlin High School
 Cambridge High School
 Waterford High School
 Greenwich High School
 Hoosick Falls High School
 Hoosic Valley High School
 Mechanicville High School
 Saratoga Catholic Central High School
 Stillwater High School
 Tamarac High School

Western Athletic Conference 
 Berne-Knox High School
 Canajoharie High School
 Duanesburg High School
 Fonda-Fultonville High School
 Fort Plain High School
 Galway High School
 Mayfield High School
 Mekeel Christian Academy
 Middleburgh High School
 Notre Dame-Bishop Gibbons High School
 Northville High School
 Oppenheim-Ephratah/St.Johnsville High School
 Schoharie High School

See also
 High School Sports
 List of high schools in New York

References

External links
 Section 2 website

Organizations based in New York (state)
High school sports associations in the United States
Sports governing bodies in the United States
New York State Public High School Athletic Association sections